Allison Marie Pineau (born 2 May 1989) is a French handballer for RK Krim and the French national team. She won gold medal at the 2017 World Championship, 2018 European Championship and 2020 Olympic Games.

She was voted World Handball Player of the Year 2009 by the International Handball Federation.

Career
In March 2012, Pineau agreed with Romanian CS Oltchim Râmnicu Vâlcea and joined the club on 1 July 2012.

Between 2013 and 2015, she played for ŽRK Vardar and RK Krim. With ŽRK Vardar, she again reached the semifinals of the Champions League in the 2013–14 season claiming the bronze medal after beating FC Midtjylland 34–31.

In the summer of 2015, she returned to Romania after the three months at Nîmes in France. In 2017 she signed a contract with French team Brest Bretagne HB.

International honours
National team
Olympics:
Gold Medalist: 2020
Silver Medalist: 2016 
World Championship:
Gold Medalist: 2017
Silver Medalist: 2009, 2011, 2021
European Championship:
Gold Medalist: 2018
Bronze Medalist: 2016

Club
EHF Champions League:
Bronze Medalist: 2014
Semifinalist: 2013

Individual awards
IHF World Player of the Year: 2009
All-Star Playmaker of the World Championship: 2009, 2011 
Championnat de France Best Defender: 2018

References

External links

1989 births
Living people
Sportspeople from Chartres
Olympic handball players of France
Expatriate handball players
French expatriate sportspeople in North Macedonia
French expatriate sportspeople in Romania
French expatriate sportspeople in Slovenia
French female handball players
French people of Guadeloupean descent
SCM Râmnicu Vâlcea (handball) players
CS Minaur Baia Mare (women's handball) players
Handball players at the 2012 Summer Olympics
Handball players at the 2016 Summer Olympics
Handball players at the 2020 Summer Olympics
Medalists at the 2016 Summer Olympics
Medalists at the 2020 Summer Olympics
Olympic gold medalists for France
Olympic silver medalists for France
Olympic medalists in handball
European champions for France
Mediterranean Games medalists in handball
Mediterranean Games gold medalists for France
Competitors at the 2009 Mediterranean Games